Wilfred Bailey "Bill" Brown (August 2, 1922 – January 15, 2007) was an American professional basketball player in the United States' National Basketball League (NBL). He played for the Oshkosh All-Stars and Waterloo Hawks during the 1948–49 season. After a collegiate career at the University of Maryland, College Park, Brown was selected in the 1948 BAA draft by the Philadelphia Warriors as the 76th overall pick. He pursued a career in the NBL, however, and played both the forward and guard positions.

References

1922 births
2007 deaths
American men's basketball players
Basketball players from Kentucky
Forwards (basketball)
Guards (basketball)
Maryland Terrapins men's basketball players
Oshkosh All-Stars players
People from Webster County, Kentucky
Philadelphia Warriors draft picks
Waterloo Hawks players